The National Institute of Technology (Norwegian: Statens teknologiske institutt; STI) was a Norwegian government agency and research institute that existed from 1917 to 1988, and that was active in technological research and innovation. It was established by the Storting (Parliament) on 6 May 1916, aimed at helping smaller industry and enterprises, and was headquartered in Oslo. In 1988 the government agency was dissolved and its activities were partially transferred to a private foundation, Teknologisk Institutt (TI). The foundation became a limited company in 2002, and was sold to Kiwa NV in 2015. The institute had around 250 employees.

It should not be confused with the Norwegian Institute of Technology.

References

External links 
Teknologisk Institutt

Defunct government agencies of Norway
Organisations based in Oslo